Facundo Mena was the defending champion but chose not to defend his title.

Juan Manuel Cerúndolo won the title after defeating Gian Marco Moroni 7–5, 7–6(9–7) in the final.

Seeds

Draw

Finals

Top half

Bottom half

References

External links
Main draw
Qualifying draw

Città di Como Challenger - 1
2021 Singles